Robert Frank Camp (born February 7, 1956) is an American animator, writer, cartoonist, comic book artist, storyboard artist, director, and producer. Camp has been nominated for two Emmys, a CableACE Award, and an Annie Award for his work on The Ren & Stimpy Show.

Career
Camp started his animation career as a designer for animated series such as ThunderCats, Silverhawks, TigerSharks, and several other series produced by Rankin/Bass. He then worked as a designer on The Real Ghostbusters for DiC, and later as a storyboard artist on Tiny Toon Adventures for Warner Bros. Television.

Camp was a co-founder of and director for Spümcø, the animation studio that created The Ren & Stimpy Show. He played a major role in the studio's creative force until September 21, 1992, when he left to work for Games Productions (a.k.a. Games Animation), the animation studio Nickelodeon initially created to continue work on The Ren and Stimpy Show  after Spümcø and co-creator John Kricfalusi had been fired. At Games, Camp was promoted to creative director of The Ren and Stimpy Show and supervised work on the episodes made. After Ren & Stimpy ended in 1995, Camp and former Ren & Stimpy writer Jim Gomez began developing a new series for Nickelodeon titled Kid Komet and Galaxy Gal, which was never picked up for a full series.

In the 1980s, Camp worked at Marvel Comics as an illustrator on many comic titles including G.I. Joe, Crazy Magazine, Bizarre Adventures, Savage Tales, Conan the Barbarian, and The 'Nam.

In the 2000s, Camp worked as a storyboard artist on animated feature films such as Looney Tunes: Back in Action and Ice Age: The Meltdown, and also as a director on Robotboy.

Camp currently teaches at the School of Visual Arts in New York City.

Filmography

Television
 ThunderCats, Silverhawks, TigerSharks, Mini Monsters, Karate Kat, Street Frogs (1985–1987) – Rankin/Bass (Development artist, design lead)
 The Real Ghostbusters (1986) – DiC (Character designer)
 Mighty Mouse: The New Adventures (1987) – Viacom/Bakshi-Hyde Ventures (Character designer)
 The New Adventures of Beany and Cecil (1988) – DiC (Character designer)
 Tiny Toon Adventures (1990) – Warner Bros. Television (Storyboard artist)
 Attack of the Killer Tomatoes (1990) – Marvel Productions/Fox (Storyboard director)
 The Ren & Stimpy Show (1991–1995) – Nickelodeon (Story editor, story, storyboard artist, writer, director, producer, supervising director, creative director, voice actor)
 Space Goofs (1997) – Gaumont Multimedia (Story, storyboard artist, co-story supervisor, voice director)
 Cow and Chicken (1997–1999) – Cartoon Network (Storyboard artist)
 I Am Weasel (1997–1999) – Cartoon Network (Storyboard artist)
 The Cartoon Cartoon Show (1999) – Cartoon Network (Dialogue director, writer, director, storyboard artist) (The Lucky Lydia Show)
 Evil Con Carne (2001) – Cartoon Network (Storyboard artist) 
 Jackie Chan Adventures (2001–2003) – Columbia TriStar Television (Storyboard artist)
 Ozzy & Drix (2002) – Warner Bros. Animation (Storyboard artist)
 Robotboy (2005–2008) – Cartoon Network/Alphanim (Director, writer)
 Sym-Bionic Titan (2010) – Cartoon Network (Storyboard artist)
 Kick Buttowski: Suburban Daredevil (2010–2011) – Disney (Storyboard artist)
 Bubble Guppies (2011) – Nickelodeon (Storyboard supervisor)
 YooHoo & Friends (2012) – Toonzone Studios (Storyboard artist)
 SpongeBob SquarePants (2015–present) – Nickelodeon (Storyboard artist, character designer, supervising director)
 Mighty Magiswords (2016) – Cartoon Network (Writer & storyboard artist)

Film
 How the Grinch Stole Christmas! (2000) – Universal Pictures/Imagine Entertainment (Storyboard artist)
 Osmosis Jones (2001) – Warner Bros. Pictures (Storyboard artist)
 Cats & Dogs (2001) – Warner Bros. Pictures (Storyboard artist)
 Scooby-Doo (2002) – Warner Bros. Pictures (Storyboard artist)
 Looney Tunes: Back in Action (2003) – Warner Bros. Pictures (Storyboard artist)
 Robots (2005) – Blue Sky Studios/20th Century Fox (Storyboard artist)
 Ice Age: The Meltdown (2006) – Blue Sky Studios/20th Century Fox (Storyboard artist)
 Epic (2013) – Blue Sky Studios/20th Century Fox (storyboard artist)
 The SpongeBob Movie: Sponge Out of Water (2015) – Paramount Pictures/Nickelodeon Movies (Layout artist)
 Rumble (2021) – Paramount Pictures/Paramount Animation (Storyboard artist)

Marvel Comics covers – selected bibliography
The 'Nam (1986) Issues #14, #17, #20, #22
Conan the Destroyer (1985) #1, #2

References

External links

Bob Camp's blog
Bob Camp's Bob Lab Website
Bob Camp interview with Super Hero Speak - 2016
Lambiek Comiclopedia article.

Living people
American animators
American cartoonists
American comics artists
American comics creators
American comics writers
American storyboard artists
American television producers
American television directors
American animated film directors
American animated film producers
American television writers
American male screenwriters
American male television writers
Spümcø
American voice directors
1956 births